Cangrejal is a district of the Acosta canton, in the San José province of Costa Rica.

Geography 
Cangrejal has an area of  km2 and an elevation of  metres.

Demographics 

For the 2011 census, Cangrejal had a population of  inhabitants.

Transportation

Road transportation 
The district is covered by the following road routes:
 National Route 301

References 

Districts of San José Province
Populated places in San José Province